Joanna Elizabeth Haylen is an Australian politician who was elected to the New South Wales Legislative Assembly as the member for Summer Hill for the Labor Party at the 2015 New South Wales state election.

Graduating from the University of Sydney with a Bachelor of Arts, Haylen served as youngest ever female Mayor of Marrickville from 2013 to 2014. She previously worked as a Director of Administration in the office of former Prime Minister Julia Gillard and as Deputy Chief of Staff for former Deputy Prime Minister Anthony Albanese.

At the 2013 state redistribution, the seat of the Marrickville was abolished and was replaced with the seats of Newtown and Summer Hill. In November 2013, the sitting member for Marrickville, Carmel Tebbutt, announced she would not be recontesting at the 2015 state election. Haylen later won pre-selection for Summer Hill. She was elected to the seat in 2015 and spent five months as a member of the Select Committee on the Regulation of Brothels.

Haylen was re-elected to the seat of Summer Hill in 2019 with a swing of +11.8% and was appointed as Shadow Minister for Active Transport, the Cost of Living, Seniors and Volunteers in the shadow Ministry of Jodi McKay.

Haylen was appointed as the Shadow Minister for Transport in the shadow Ministry of Chris Minns in 2021.

References

External links
 

Living people
Australian Labor Party members of the Parliament of New South Wales
Members of the New South Wales Legislative Assembly
Labor Left politicians
Mayors of Marrickville
Politicians from Sydney
Year of birth missing (living people)
Place of birth missing (living people)
21st-century Australian politicians
Women members of the New South Wales Legislative Assembly
Women mayors of places in New South Wales
21st-century Australian women politicians